Drissa Diarrassouba, (born 15 November 1994 in Abidjan, Ivory Coast) is an Ivorian professional footballer who plays as a forward, and is a former Ivory Coast national youth player.

Club career

FC Shirak
Drissa Diarrassouba joined the Armenian Premier League side FC Shirak in 2014. 

In January 2016, Diarrassouba signed a three-year contract with Shirak.

Padideh
Drissa joined the Persian Gulf Pro League side Padideh on 29 July 2016 with a one-year contract.

Pyunik
Diarrassouba left FC Pyunik on 3 August 2018.

Gandzasar Kapan
In August 2018, Diarrassouba joined Gandzasar Kapan.

References

1994 births
Living people
Ivorian footballers
Armenian Premier League players
Persian Gulf Pro League players
FC Shirak players
Shahr Khodro F.C. players
FC Pyunik players
FC Gandzasar Kapan players
Ivorian expatriate footballers
Expatriate footballers in Iran
Expatriate footballers in Armenia
Association football forwards
Ivory Coast youth international footballers